Miles Davis Volume 2 is the fifth studio album by musician Miles Davis. It refers to two separate but related entities.  The first is a Miles Davis studio album released by Blue Note Records as a 10-inch LP, as BLP 5022 in 1953.  The six tracks from this LP plus five alternate takes were released on CD in 1990 and remastered with restored artwork in 2001.

The second Miles Davis Volume 2 is a compilation of tracks from all three of his sessions with the label, released (with different cover art) in 1956 as BLP 1502.

The original 10-inch LP (BLP 5022) contained music from Davis' second session for Blue Note, recorded April 20, 1953. The recording was made at a point in Davis' life when he was struggling with heroin addiction, and in his autobiography Davis remembers that he, Jimmy Heath, and Art Blakey were all very high in the studio. Davis also states that the song title "C.T.A." was named after Heath's girlfriend Connie Theresa Ann.

The 1990 CD (Blue Note CDP 7 81502 2) contained the music recorded at the April 20, 1953, session, including all of the original 10"LP, along with alternate takes from the same session, but using the cover art from the 1956 compilation LP.  The 2001 CD (Blue Note 7243 5 32611 2 2), remastered by Rudy Van Gelder, restored the artwork from BLP 5022 with the same track list.  Davis' other recordings for Blue Note (in 1952 and 1954) are collected on the RVG CD edition of Miles Davis Volume 1.

The 12-inch LP (BLP 1502) was originally released in 1956 (following Miles Davis Volume 1 (BLP 1501)) after Davis won the Down Beat readers poll as best trumpeter. The two volumes of repackaged Miles Davis material were the first releases in Blue Note's new 1500 series of 12"LPs. The music compiled on the two volumes was from three separate recording sessions made over 1952–54, some of which had been previously issued as singles, and as three now discontinued 10" LPs. Volume 2 contained material from all three sessions, and some previously unreleased alternate takes. The master takes of the March 6, 1954 session, which made up the bulk of the 12"LP, had originally been issued in 10"LP format under the title Miles Davis, Volume 3 (BLP 5040), and the May 9, 1952 material had been previously released the 10" LP Young Man with a Horn (BLP 5013).  Some Japanese CD versions reproduce the original 12"LP running order.

Track listing

10" LP
BLP 5022, all tracks recorded April 20, 1953:

CD
RVG Edition released 2001, all tracks recorded April 20, 1953:

12" LP 
BLP 1502:

Personnel
May 9, 1952
 Miles Davis – trumpet
 J. J. Johnson – trombone
 Jackie McLean – alto saxophone
 Gil Coggins – piano
 Oscar Pettiford – bass
 Kenny Clarke – drums

April 20, 1953
 Miles Davis – trumpet
 J. J. Johnson – trombone
 Jimmy Heath – tenor saxophone
 Gil Coggins – piano
 Percy Heath – bass
 Art Blakey – drums

March 6, 1954
 Miles Davis – trumpet
 Horace Silver – piano
 Percy Heath – bass
 Art Blakey – drums

References

1956 compilation albums
Albums produced by Michael Cuscuna
Blue Note Records compilation albums
Miles Davis compilation albums

de:Miles Davis Volume 2